Peter Grant (born 11 March 1994) is a Scottish professional footballer who plays as a defender for Dumbarton on loan from Clyde.

Career
Grant began his career with Peterborough United, but was unable to break into the first team and spent time on loan to Thurrock and Histon before being released by the club in May 2014.

In July 2014, Grant signed for Scottish Championship club Falkirk. In his first season at Falkirk, the club reached the Scottish Cup Final, where they played Inverness Caledonian Thistle. Grant scored in the final, making it 1–1, although Falkirk went on to lose 2–1. His second season at the club ended early when he suffered a cruciate ligament injury in a match against Livingston in January 2016. It was the second time Grant had sustained this injury, having injured his left knee as a seventeen-year-old at Peterborough. He was released by Falkirk after the 2017–18 season.

Grant signed for Plymouth Argyle in June 2018. Plymouth cancelled his contract by mutual consent in January 2019.

Grant then signed for League Two side Carlisle United until the end of the 2018–19 season, when he was released.

On 8 July 2019, Grant signed for Greenock Morton. After spells with Queen's Park and Clyde, Grant joined Dumbarton on loan in February 2023.

Personal life
Grant is the son of Peter Grant, who played for Celtic in the 1980s and 1990s. His brother Ray is also a footballer.

Career statistics

References

External links

1994 births
Living people
Falkirk F.C. players
Association football defenders
Scottish Professional Football League players
Scottish footballers
Peterborough United F.C. players
Thurrock F.C. players
Histon F.C. players
Plymouth Argyle F.C. players
Carlisle United F.C. players
Greenock Morton F.C. players
English Football League players
Footballers from Bellshill
Sportspeople from Norfolk
Anglo-Scots
Queen's Park F.C. players
Clyde F.C. players
Dumbarton F.C. players